Bonaventure de Bar, who was born in 1700 in Paris, painted after the manner of Watteau. Bar was a pupil of Claude Guy Halle. He became a member of the Academy at Paris in September 1728, or December 1727, and his reception painting, a 'Fête Champêtre,' is in the Louvre. He died on September 1, 1729.

References

Further reading
For an up-to-date, authoritative account of Bonaventure de Bar see Martin Eidelberg's series of articles:

18th-century French painters
French male painters
1700 births
1729 deaths
18th-century French male artists